The 2014 Monte Carlo Rally (formally known as the 82ème Rallye Automobile Monte-Carlo) is a motor racing event for rally cars that was held over three days between 14 and 18 January 2014. It marked the eighty-second running of the Monte Carlo Rally, and was the first round of the 2014 World Rally Championship, WRC-2 and WRC-3 seasons. After being based in the town of Valence for the 2013 event, the rally headquarters was relocated to Gap in the French province of Hautes-Alpes. The rally itself was run over fifteen special stages, with teams and drivers contesting  in competitive stages.

Former Formula 1 Driver Robert Kubica won the first two stages of the rally before being caught by Bryan Bouffier, who moved into the lead heading into the first days afternoon stages. 

Bouffier led heading into the second day but was overtaken by Sebastian Ogier, following a lengthy spin on SS9. Kubica's rally ended on the same stage after sliding off the road under braking and being unable to recover onto the tarmac.

It was the first Monte Carlo Rally event since 2001 without Sebastien Loeb.

Entry list

Results

Event standings

Championship standings after the race

WRC

Drivers' Championship standings

Manufacturers' Championship standings

Other

WRC2 Drivers' Championship standings

WRC3 Drivers' Championship standings

References

Results – juwra.com/World Rally Archive
Results – ewrc-results.com

External links 
 
 The official website of the World Rally Championship

2013
Monte Carlo Rally
Rally
Monte Carlo